Minuscule 452 (in the Gregory-Aland numbering), α 206 (in the Soden numbering), is a Greek minuscule manuscript of the New Testament, on parchment. Palaeographically it has been assigned to the 12th century. Formerly it was labelled by 80a, 91p and 42r.

Description 

The codex contains the text of the New Testament except Gospels on 327 parchment leaves. The text is written in one column per page, in 21-22 lines per page. The letters are written above lines.

The order of books: Book of Acts, Catholic epistles, Pauline epistles (Hebrews before 1 Timothy), and Book of Revelation.

Text 

The Greek text of the codex is a representative of the Byzantine text-type. Aland placed it in Category V.

History 

Scrivener and Gregory dated the manuscript to the 12th century. Henry Stevenson to the 10th century. Currently the INTF dated it to the 12th century.

The manuscript was held in the Library of St. Silvester at the time of Pope Pius II. It was deposited to the Vatican Library in time of Pope Clement XI.

The manuscript was added to the list of the New Testament manuscripts by Scholz (1794-1852).
Formerly it was labelled by 80a, 91p and 42r. In 1908 Gregory gave the number 452 to it.

The manuscript was examined by Birch, Scholz, Duchesne, Stevenson, and C. R. Gregory (1886). It was slightly collated by Scholz. Hoskier collated the text of the Apocalypse.

It is currently housed at the Vatican Library (Reg. gr. Pii II 50) in Rome.

See also 

 List of New Testament minuscules
 Biblical manuscript
 Textual criticism

References

Further reading 

 H. C. Hoskier, Concerning the Text of the Apocalypse: Collation of All Existing Available Greek Documents with the Standard Text of Stephen’s Third Edition Together with the Testimony of Versions, Commentaries and Fathers. vol. 1 (London: Bernard Quaritch, Ltd., 1929), pp. 110–114.
 Henry Stevenson, Codices manuscripti Graeci Reginae Svecorum et Pii Pp. II. Bibliothecae Vaticanae, descripti praeside I.B. Cardinali Pitra, Rom 1888, p. 167-169.

Greek New Testament minuscules
12th-century biblical manuscripts
Manuscripts of the Vatican Library